is a slice-of-life Japanese manga series by Nobuyuki Takagi and Yōsuke Kuroda, originally serialized between April 2000 and July 2002 in Monthly Comic Dengeki Daioh. It follows the peaceful daily lives of three sisters who live in a library.

The manga was adapted into a 13-episode anime television series directed by Koji Masunari, who is also known as the director of the anime OVA series Read or Die (2001) and Kamichu! (2005). It is described by critics as a prime example of the iyashikei or "healing type" anime genre.

Plot 

Kokoro Library is a heartwarming slice of life series depicting the peaceful everyday lives of three orphaned sisters as they take care of the library which also serves as their family home. The anime delves more deeply into the library's history, its connection to the local town, and challenges faced by the sisters.

Kokoro, the youngest, has just joined her sisters Aruto and Iina as an official librarian. The library receives few visitors, and each visit is often the subject of an entire episode. Kokoro learns the meaning of being a librarian, meets her favourite author, and takes a family trip to the seaside. The library is called "the place where miracles happen", although we see nothing more magical than Kokoro's ability to produce rainbows with her watering can.

Events take a dramatic twist when phantom thief Funny Tortoise steals a mysterious locked book which belonged to Kokoro's father, who died when she was very young. Worse, the town mayor announces that the library will be closed due to lack of visitors. Kokoro is heartbroken, but believes the answer may lie in the stolen book, which has meanwhile been returned to the library.

The next episode is seen from the point of view of a young soldier named Sant Jordi, during a war which has seen the town heavily bombed. Jordi's positive attitude makes an impression on his comrades, who occupy a ruined library. When the town is approached by an enemy armored division, Jordi's decision to destroy the bridge without killing the enemy ultimately saves the town. He begins to distribute library books to the townsfolk to lift their spirits in the difficult post-war period, ultimately settling in the town and constructing Kokoro Library.

Kokoro, reading the story in what is revealed to be her father's diary of the war, finally has a connection to the parents she never knew. The sisters head to town hall to show the diary to the mayor, hoping to change her mind. They arrive to discover a massive protest against the library's shutdown—the people of the town have not forgotten Jordi's contributions. The mayor allows the library to remain open, and Kokoro and her sisters continue to live their peaceful days together in the library.

Production

Yōsuke Kuroda, a scriptwriter who had highly appreciated Takagi's doujin works published under the name "Boo", heard from Takagi himself that he was going to retire from his company and train to become a manga artist. "It's too late to train to become a manga artist now when you have the ability," he said, and pitched Takagi to the editor-in-chief of Monthly Comic Dengeki Daioh, whom he knew.

The editor also appreciated Boo's drawing style and immediately gave him a positive response for serialization. At that time, Kuroda was instructed to write a scenario, which he accepted, and the serialization took shape. According to Kuroda, it took only an hour and a half from the time he was informed of Takagi's resignation to the time he informed Takagi that the serialization had been decided. As a result, Kuroda was in charge of the script for both the original story and the animation.

Kokoro Library was animated digitally, rather than on cels as had been used for Studio Deen's animated productions until the late 1990s. However, limited-edition hand-painted replica cels were made available to collectors for ¥5,000 by online sale.

The setting of Kokoro Library is ambiguous. The town is identified in signage as "Toaru City" (都亜瑠), a homonym for the phrase "a certain city", although it is never named in dialogue.  We are never explicitly told the name of the country where the library is situated, or the year when the series takes place. Rather, it is a pastiche of Japanese and European cultural elements. Several pieces of mid-20th century technology appear: Iina drives a redecorated World War II Volkswagen Schwimmwagen, while other characters drive the post-war Citroën H Van and Citroën DS. In episode 11, Jordi's side carry the Karabiner 98k used by German troops in World War II, while the enemy armored unit fields the Russian T-34 and GAZ-67; however, neither side's nation is explicitly identified. Modern computers and cameras also appear, along with science fiction androids.

The anime was notable as Chiwa Saitō's first major voice acting role. Saitō would go on to perform over three hundred anime voice roles in the following two decades.

Kokoro and the comparoid June make appearances in Nobuyuki Takagi's 2003 manga Pure Marionation, set eight years after Kokoro Library.

Cast

Main characters

 Kokoro
 
 , aged 10, is the youngest of the three sisters, and calls herself "the girl with the same name as the library". She wears a red librarian uniform. She is positive, hardworking, and innocent. She loves to read books, and her favourite author is Himemiya Kirin. Her dream is to become a fully-fledged librarian. Her special skill is to make rainbows with her watering can. She is happy to be surrounded by her sisters. Her room is decorated with cats. She likes French toast, pudding, and cake, but dislikes celery and cauliflower. Her birthday is March 18th. She does not use a surname in the series, introducing herself as "Kokoro from Kokoro Library".
 Aruto
 
 , aged 15, is the middle daughter. She wears a black uniform, and wears glasses. She is strong-willed, a good cook, and has the special ability to sleep anywhere. She secretly writes novels under the pen name Himemiya Kirin, Kokoro's favourite author. Because she stays up late to write, she often takes naps in the morning. Her hobbies include reading and cooking, and her favourite foods are Chinese cooking and cake. Her birthday is December 19th.
 Iina
 
 , aged 17, is the eldest of the three sisters. She wears a blue uniform. Her hobby is photography, and she takes many photographs of her sisters, especially Kokoro, and she has many photos of her on her wall. She is highly protective of Kokoro, and has trouble coping when Kokoro is away for a long time. She even sleeps with Kokoro plushies. She drives a redecorated military surplus white Schwimmwagen with the license plate "556" (goroawase for "ko-ko-ro"). Surprisingly, she is good with computers. She likes noodles, sweet things, and Assam milk tea. Her birthday is October 2nd.

The names of the three sisters together form the phrase "kokoro aru to ii na," meaning "it's good to have a heart". In the anime, it is revealed that the sisters were intentionally given these names by their parents in order to spell out this motto. This phrase appears as a subtitle on the cover of the manga, but is not immediately revealed in the anime, the DVDs for which instead use the subtitle "Do you remember these heartful days?"

Supporting cast

 Akaha Okajima
 
 , age 9, is a friend of Kokoro who visits the library. She lives in a villa nearby. Her mother is Midori Okajima. She is also a relative of Misato Fukami. Akaha and Kokoro met when they were younger, after she got lost while chasing squirrels. Like Kokoro, she enjoys reading.
 Midori Okajima
 
  is Akaha's mother and a visitor to the library. The character previously appeared as an original character of Takagi's for the Mirai Hachi Karuto Shoukai at Winter Comiket 1998.
 Kit
  is Kokoro's cat.

Anime-only characters

A number of characters are original to the anime but do not appear in the manga.
 Jun Uezawa
 
 , age 20, is the truck driver who makes deliveries to Kokoro Library. He has a crush on Iina, but she is unaware of this. The sisters often take advantage of him to help with their plans, and he is often comically mistaken for a suspicious person.
 Kaede Hoshino
 
  is the first visitor who Kokoro lends a book to. She rides a Vespa. She spends only a little time in town before she has to leave due to her job, but loves Kokoro Library at her first visit.
 Bikers
 , Kenji Hamada, Hiroaki Miura
 Bikers who ride Harley-Davidson motorcycles. They sometimes give Kokoro a ride in their sidecar. 
 Sarara Saeki
 
  is Himemiya Kirin's editor. She works for Celery Library's editorial development. She is aware of Aruto's secret identity as Himemiya Kirin.
 Misato Fukami
 
  is a girl who lives by the seaside. She suffers from poor health, having the same illness as her late mother. She is Akaha's relative. She is served by a butler (VA: Takuma Suzuki) and maid (VA: Yukiko Mannaka), who are overprotective of her due to her health, and try to prevent her from going outdoors. She is lonely, and dreams of being able to go outside to see the ocean up close and meet the dolphins she can see from her window.
 Misato's Father
 
  is Misato Fukami's father.
 Funny Tortoise
 
  is a legendary thief and master of disguise. He makes his daring escapes in a hot air balloon.
 Inspector Kajihara
 
  is an officer working for Interpol to capture Funny Tortoise. He is supported by a team of female officers, Kaji's Angels. During the war he guarded the town as a member of Third Squad, one of only two soldiers in the unit with any military training. He lost his wife and children during the war, after which he became argumentative and on edge, often fighting with Aigame.
 Kaji's Angels
 , Eri Saitō, Hiroko Takahashi, Mami Kosuge, Nao Takamori
  are a group of uniformed all-female officers who support Inspector Kajihara.
 Itou
 
  is one of Kaji's Angels.
 Hibiki Asakura
 
  is the examiner for Kokoro's librarian training.
 June
 
  is a comparoid, an android designed for human support. A prototype in testing developed by Nakanishi Industry, she meets Kokoro during librarian training. She cares about efficiency and duty, but is also understanding and kind, and learns from Kokoro the meaning of being a librarian. Her uniform is blue.
 Hikari Inoue
 
  is an apprentice librarian who comes to Kokoro Library in search of a miracle. Her librarian uniform is pink. Her mother is Akari Inoue. She is quiet at first and easily upset, but after opening up to Kokoro is revealed to be strong-minded, honest, affectionate, and cynical.
 Marie Momochi
 
  is the mayor of the town. Her name suggests a relation to Sergeant Momochi. She is polite, straightforward, and utilitarian. An outsider who came to the town on the advice of her father, she does not understand the importance of the library at first.
 Raika Mizumoto
 
  is the mayor's secretary. Based on her response to the sisters' "nico nico rin" catchphrase, she is a fan of Himemiya Kirin's works.
 Akari Inoue
 
  is Hikari Inoue's mother. She has suffered from illness for much of her life. During the war, she was cared for by nurse Kokoro Shindou.
 Kokoro Shindou
 
  is a nurse who takes care of the town during the war. She is the mother of Kokoro, Aruto and Iina. During the war she cared for Akari Inoue by bringing her books to read from the local library. She bears a resemblance to her daughter Kokoro. Kokoro Shindou died shortly after giving birth to Kokoro.
 Sant Jordi
 
  is a soldier who joins Third Squad a few months before the end of the war. He is the father of Kokoro, Aruto and Iina. Jordi is brave, polite and idealistic, but his positivity is widely appreciated. Jordi originally lost his family and home during the war, and he was conscripted into the military. After the war, he settled in the town in a cabin at the top of a hill, where he later married the nurse Kokoro Shindou and established Kokoro Library, meaning "heart". He shares Kokoro's ability to create rainbows with his watering can. Jordi died shortly after his wife.
 Sergeant Momochi
 
  is leader of Third Squad. He is kind and good-natured. He leaves the town after the war, but tells his daughter of the town, who later comes to the town to become its mayor.
 Aigame
 
 , nicknamed "Kameyan", is a soldier in Third Squad who was forcibly conscripted at age 14 after being apprehended as a petty thief. After the war, he took on a secret identity as the legendary phantom thief Funny Tortoise, a pun on his name, with "kame" meaning "turtle".
 Uezawa
 
  is a member of Third Squad. A professional driver before the war, he resents delivering weapons of war, preferring to transport something "warm". He finds Jordi's idealism to be immature. After the war, he returned to his job as a driver for hire. He is father of Jun Uezawa. At the time of the main story, he is deceased, but has imparted his values to his son. His first name is unknown.
 July
 
  is a military android. Her wish is for androids to support people's lives rather than to serve military uses.
 Officer
 The commander of an enemy armored division that arrives aboard a GAZ-67. He has a realistic face that is not typical of the characters in the Kokoro Library. While his vehicle is of Soviet design, his nation of origin is not explicitly specified.
 Bunny
 
  is a rabbit from the moon who appears to Kokoro at night to encourage her. It is later revealed to be a hand puppet which Funny Tortoise controls with ventriloquism.
 Boy
 
 An unnamed boy in a wheelchair. Kokoro meets him at the conclusion of the anime.

Manga-only characters

 Hélène DuFont
  is a blonde-haired ghost who haunts Kokoro Library. She makes a brief cameo in the anime as a background character in episode 11.
 Dr. Nodoka
  is a female doctor who takes care of Kokoro.
 Kotoko Kimihara
  is a classmate of Akaha. She is a girl who is easily mistaken for a boy.
 Saeko Kubota
  is a female novelist who comes to Kokoro Library to hide from her editor after missing her deadline. She has a mole on her mouth.
 Book Fairy
 The  is a fairy who brings happiness to Kokoro, who cherishes books.

PC original

 Minana Kurusu
  is a girl who aspires to be a guide in a library. She came to the Kokoro Library during spring break for hands-on training. She loves to read books. The color of her librarian uniform is green. She appears exclusively in the "Communication Library" PC software.

Media

Manga

Kokoro Library began serialization in the April 2000 issue of Monthly Comic Dengeki Daioh. It ran until the July 2002 issue, ending on 51 chapters in all. It was collected and published in a set of three A5 loose-leaf volumes between April 2001 and August 2002, under the Dengeki Comics Ex imprint. "A Fan Book" was released in June 2002 containing artwork and interviews.

Kokoro Library was reprinted in April 2013 in two smaller paperback volumes under the Gum Comics Plus imprint. These volumes featured new cover art by Nobuyuki Takagi which pays homage to the original April 2000 Dengeki Daioh cover.

A German translation was released by Egmont Ehapa in 2004. To date, the manga has not received an official English release.

Chapter list

Anime

The October 2001 issue of Dengeki Daioh announced the adaption of Kokoro Library into an anime. The first episode aired on TV Tokyo on Friday, October 12, 2001, at 01:15am JST (the night of Thursday, October 11 at 25:15am). Its time slot was used in the previous cours by Noir, and was followed in that slot by Aquarian Age: Sign for Evolution.

The final free-to-air television episode of Kokoro Library was episode 12, which aired on December 28, 2001 (the night of December 27). It was followed by a bonus thirteenth episode, which aired only on premium channel AT-X on February 17, 2002. A repeat of all 13 episodes aired on AT-X in 2002, again on that channel from November 2003 and again from on March 1, 2005.

The series was released in Japan on VHS and DVD in 2002. The first DVD was released January 23, 2002, containing a single episode for ¥2,500. Subsequent volumes were released monthly, containing two episodes per disc for ¥5,800, with the second disc including a box to hold all seven volumes. The first VHS was released on February 21, 2002, containing four episodes for ¥9,800, with each subsequent tape containing three episodes for ¥8,500, for a total of four tapes. Both releases included the thirteenth bonus episode. The final DVD was released on July 24, 2002. The DVD release used the 4:3 aspect ratio and was notable for use of linear PCM audio rather than the lossy Dolby Digital format.

In March 2002, the Japan Library Association announced that copies of the Kokoro Library anime would appear in 500 libraries across Japan.

From November 2002, all 13 episodes were released on DVD and Video CD in Taiwan by Mighty Media Co., Ltd.

All thirteen episodes were subsequently made available in Japan on Amazon Prime Video. To date, the series has not seen an official English translation.

Episode list

Soundtracks

A CD single was released for the series opening theme "Beagle" on October 24, 2001. The CD also includes the ending theme "Tsuki wa miteru" ("The Moon is Watching Over Me") and off-vocal versions of each. The vocals to both songs were provided by Yasuko Yamano, while the lyrics to both were written by Yuuho Iwasato, who also wrote the lyrics to Cardcaptor Sakura ending "Fruits Candy" and the Macross Frontier insert song "Infinity". Dan Miyakawa composed and arranged "Beagle", and composed "Tsuki wa miteru", which was arranged by Noriyasu Kumagai. The lyrics to "Tsuki wa Miteru" reference the children's book Papa, Please Get the Moon for Me by Eric Carle, as well as Kokoro's understanding that, like the moon, her late father continues to watch over her.

An anime soundtrack CD, Kokoro Library Original Soundtrack (ココロ図書館 オリジナル・サウンドトラック) was released by Victor Entertainment on December 19, 2001. It features 19 tracks from the anime, including the full-length versions of the opening "Beagle" and the ending "Tsuki wa miteru", and the TV size version of "Beagle". The series' soundtrack is provided by Hisaaki Hogari, who also arranged Spice and Wolf ending theme "Ringo Biyori" and Cardcaptor Sakura ending "Fruits Candy".

Other

A Kokoro Library Fan Book was published on June 10, 2002, shortly before the release of the third manga volume. It featured previously unpublished concept art, new original color art depicting scenes from the anime, interviews, and a catalog of official merchandise.

A piece of PC software was released, titled Communication Library Kokoro Toshokan (コミュニケーションライブラリーココロ図書館), which retailed for ¥5,800. It is a program to track the user's book collection. A CD-ROM artbook was announced, the release of which was delayed due to unexpected demand.

A large amount of official merchandise was produced for the Kokoro Library franchise. They included both dolls and 1/6 scale figures of the three sisters, at least ten separate posters, Broccoli trading cards, a 2002 calendar, a mouse mat, pencil boards, a bookend, several telephone cards, a CD case, a watch, three pin badges, a memo pad, and even an official replica Kokoro cosplay costume produced by Broccoli subsidiary Cospa and retailing for ¥44,800 (equivalent to US$376 in 2002).

An official Kokoro Library website was maintained, which displayed screenshots and a synopsis of each episode, and informed readers of upcoming Kokoro Library releases. While the website was no longer updated after 2002, it is still online as of 2021. TV Tokyo also briefly had a Kokoro Library webpage.

Reception

Kokoro Library'''s anime adaptation was met to generally positive reviews. The first DVD volume was reviewed by Paul Grisham of Mania.com, where he praised the use of color, saying, "Colors are rich and warm and convey the fairy tale setting of the Kokoro Library and the nearby town effectively." Paul also commented on the audio, calling it "warm and inviting without even the slightest hint of distortion." Jeremy A Beard from THEM Anime Reviews praised the "general pleasant feeling and atmosphere" of the small town depicted in the anime. Despite finding the "overall Kokoro Library experience enjoyable", Jeremy remarked that its "accompanying relaxed pacing" would turn viewers off.

Ryusuke Hikawa of Bandai Channel described Kokoro Library' as a monumental work which has perfected the "healing type" (iyashikei) genre of anime, intended to soothe the viewer after a hard day of work. He described it as lyrical and truly heartful, and praised Chiwa Saitō's voice as Kokoro.

In the Anihabara anime rankings poll of anime fans in the Kantō region for February 2002, Kokoro Library was rated #8, and #10 for November 2001. The December 2001 anime song ranking placed Kokoro Library''s opening "Beagle" at #5, and the ending "Tsuki wa Miteru" at #8.

References

Notes

External links 
 Kokoro Toshokan website 
 KoKoSho Style - Nobuyuki Takagi's Kokoro Library homepage  (archived 2004)

2000 manga
2001 anime television series debuts
ASCII Media Works manga
Dengeki Comics
Dengeki Daioh
Kadokawa Dwango franchises
Television shows written by Yōsuke Kuroda
Shōnen manga
Studio Deen